The Dominion was a Canadian transcontinental passenger train operated by the Canadian Pacific Railway. It first began as a summer service between Toronto, Ontario and Vancouver, British Columbia, operating in 1931 and 1932. Effective June 23, 1933 it replaced the Imperial Limited as the CPR's main transcontinental service and included a Montreal, Quebec – Sudbury, Ontario section.

It remained CPR's flagship train until the introduction of the stainless steel dome streamliner The Canadian on 24 April 1955. In 1960 the train was reconfigured as a "transcontinental local" service on the same route as the Canadian to provide services on shorter trips. The Dominion had previously carried a large amount of mail and express parcels, which afterward was carried on fast freights as well as on The Canadian. This reduced The Dominion to a typical consist of four coaches and a baggage car. The service was eliminated officially on 24 April 1966, but continued on as the Expo Limited (serving the Montreal World's Fair) for much of 1967.

References 

Named passenger trains of Canada
Named passenger trains of Ontario
Railway services introduced in 1931
Canadian Pacific Railway passenger trains
Railway services discontinued in 1966
1931 establishments in Canada
1966 disestablishments in Canada